Gloria-Theater may refer to several theatres in Germany and Austria:
 Gloria-Theater (Bad Säckingen)
 Gloria-Theater (Herten)
 Gloria-Theater (Köln)
 Gloria-Theater (Neuss)
 Gloria Theater (Neuenrade)
 Gloria-Theater (Vienna)